Agent Kannayiram is a 2022 Indian Tamil-language comedy mystery film directed by Manoj Beedha and produced by Labyrinth Films. The film stars Santhanam and Riya Suman with a supporting cast including Munishkanth, and Redin Kingsley. The film's music is composed by Yuvan Shankar Raja, with cinematography handled by duo Theni Eashwar and Saravanan Ramasamy and editing done by Ajay. It is a remake of the 2019 Telugu film Agent Sai Srinivasa Athreya. The film was released in theatres on 25 November 2022 to mixed reviews from critics.

Plot
Kannayiram, a self-proclaimed, unassuming private detective with sleeplessness issue, grieving for his mother’s death, forcefully stays in his native village for the asset dispute of his family heirloom. Aadhirai, a documentary filmmaker who visits the village for her Project work meets Kannayiram for her interview. Aadhirai gives information about the increasing number of unidentified dead bodies found in and around Coimbatore region. Kannayiram takes up this case to prove his calibre.

Cast
 Santhanam as Kannayiram
 Riya Suman as Aadhirai
 Munishkanth as Kumarappan
 Redin Kingsley as Medical Shop Staff
 Pugazh as Maayaavi
 E. Ramdoss as Sub Inspector
 Guru Somasundaram as Kannayiram's father
 Indhumathy
 Madhan Dhakshinamoorthy
 Aadhira
 Vanessa Cruez

Production 
Labyrinth Films signed on director Manoj Beedha (who earlier directed Vanjagar Ulagam) to direct the Tamil remake of 2019 Telugu film Agent Sai Srinivasa Athreya for their production house with Santhanam to portray the leading role. Riya Suman was cast as the female lead. Principal photography began on 1 February 2021 in Coimbatore with the majority of the portions shot in Coimbatore, Pollachi and Kerala. After 55 days of shoot, the film's final schedule was completed in October 2021. The title and the first look poster of the film were unveiled by director Lokesh Kanagaraj via his Twitter account on 15 October 2021. In January 2022, actors Arya and Jiiva released the teaser of the film on the occasion of Santhanam's birthday.

Soundtrack

The music for the film is composed by Yuvan Shankar Raja, collaborating with Santhanam for the second time (after Dikkiloona) with Santhanam after the latter's transformation into lead roles.

Release

Theatrical 
The film is scheduled to be released theatrically on 24 November 2022, but later pushed by a day to 25 November.<ref>{{Cite web |date=24 November 2022 |title=Agent Kannayiram is a different film' |url=https://newstodaynet.com/2022/11/24/agent-kannayiram-is-a-different-film/ |access-date=24 November 2022 |website=News Today |archive-date=24 November 2022 |archive-url=https://web.archive.org/web/20221124090835/https://newstodaynet.com/2022/11/24/agent-kannayiram-is-a-different-film/ |url-status=live}}</ref>

 Home media 
The digital streaming rights of the film were acquired by Sun NXT, while the satellite rights of the film were sold to Sun TV.

Reception

M. Suganth of The Times of India rated the film 2.5 out of 5 stars and wrote "Throughout the first half, the film seems indecisive on what it wants to be and the jagged editing only leads to what feels like disorienting narrative jumps." Kirubhakar Purushothaman of The Indian Express rated the film 2 out of 5 stars and wrote "Everything is unpronounced and lacks the impact the director has aimed for thus we are left with an underwhelming film that tries too hard. Not just the gun, even the film fails to fire." Srivatsan S of The Hindu wrote "Unfortunately Agent Kannayiram ends up being an exasperating watch lacking a soul, fittingly, for a film about dead bodies and lonely deaths." Vishal Menon of Film Companion wrote "You get a just-about-watchable comedy thriller that you start forgetting as you’re watching it." Soundarya Athimuthu of The Quint gave the film’s rating 3.5 out of 5 and wrote "The Tamil remake is a polished version of the original. A lot of effort has gone into cinematography, which is commendable." Thinkal Menon of OTT Play gave the film 1.5 out of 5 stars and wrote "A Santhanam-starrer usually is loaded with minimum entertaining elements irrespective of its total outcome. But this time, he tests patience, thanks to his awful decision to remake an engaging movie." Yuva Nandini of ABP Live gave the film 4 out of 5 stars and wrote "Agent Kannayiram is sure to be one of the best in Santhanam's career." Avinash Ramachandran of Cinema Express wrote "Agent Kannayiram is a hyper-stylised version of Agent Sai Srinivasa Athreya but misses out on hitting the same highs as the original." Dinamalar rated the film 2 out of 5 stars. Ashwin Ram of Moviecrow'' rated the film 2 out of 5 and wrote "A remake that’s neither faithful to the original nor to adapted language. Already when everything seems so dull in the flick, the changes made spoils the show further."

References 

Tamil remakes of Telugu films
Films scored by Yuvan Shankar Raja
2020s Tamil-language films
Indian comedy mystery films
2020s comedy mystery films